Nimbehuli is a 2014 Kannada language comedy film written and directed by Hemanth Hegde and produced by veteran director Subhash Ghai. latters marked a maiden Kannada venture. After success of director's first venture Housefull collaborate with Subhash Ghai's production house Mukta Arts for new project. The makers of the 2015 Hindi movie Kis Kisko Pyaar Karoon were sent legal notice for plagiarism. Initially Anupam Kher  signed to the project for pivot role but later walked out of the movie.

Plot
Sriram loves a girl, but is unable to get the approval of her parents for marriage. But accidentally he marries three other girls. No one knows of Sriram marriages other than his close friend. 
During the marriage struggle, he finally gets his lover’s parents to agree to their marriage.

Cast
 Hemanth Hegde as Sriram
 Madhurima Tuli as Janaki
 Komal Jha as Bhoomika
 Nivedhitha as Sitha
 Bullet Prakash as Karuna Raaga
 Girija Lokesh
 Ramesh Bhat
 Om Prakash Rao

Soundtrack

The song "Rama Rama" penned by Dundiraj, a popular poet and composed by Veer Samarth went viral on social media. The song got 80000 hits on YouTube on short period of time. All 6 songs were composed by Veer Samarth.

Tracklist

References

External links

2014 films
2010s Kannada-language films
2014 comedy films
Indian comedy films
Films about marriage
Films about polygamy